Marios Matalon (Greek: Μάριος Ματαλών; born February 16, 1989) is a Greek professional basketball player for ASK Karditsas of the Greek A2 Basket League.

College career
Matalon played college basketball at the University of Wyoming, with the Wyoming Cowboys, only for one year in 2007.

Professional career
Some of the clubs that Matalon has played with during his pro career include: Aris Thessaloniki, AEL 1964, Kolossos, Hapoel Megido, Koroivos Amaliadas, Ilysiakos, Aries Trikala, OFI Crete, and Rethymno Cretan Kings.

On August 31, 2017, Matalon joined Apollon Patras of the Greek A2 League.

On July 24, 2018, Matalon signed a one-year deal with the Israeli team Hapoel Ramat Gan Givatayim of the Liga Leumit (Israeli 2nd Division).

On August 29, 2019, Matalon returned to Greece and signed with Koroivos Amaliadas.

References

External links
EuroCup Profile
RealGM.com Profile
Eurobasket.com Profile
Greek Basket League Profile
Draftexpress.com Profile

1989 births
Living people
A.E.L. 1964 B.C. players
Apollon Patras B.C. players
Aries Trikala B.C. players
Aris B.C. players
Greek expatriate basketball people in the United States
Greek men's basketball players
Hapoel Afula players
Hapoel Ramat Gan Givatayim B.C. players
Ilysiakos B.C. players
Israeli men's basketball players
Italian men's basketball players
Kolossos Rodou B.C. players
Koroivos B.C. players
OFI Crete B.C. players
Panionios B.C. players
Rethymno B.C. players
Basketball players from Thessaloniki
Wyoming Cowboys basketball players
Point guards